The Magic Tree (pronounced ) is an International Emmy Award-winning Polish-produced television series that ran from 2004 to 2006 on Telewizja Polska. The live-action children's program was directed by Andrzej Maleszka. A movie continuation under the same title was produced in 2009. There's also a book series, which contains ten books: Czerwone Krzesło (The Red Chair), Tajemnica Mostu (Mystery of the Bridge), Olbrzym (Giant), Pojedynek (Duel), Gra (Game), Cień Smoka (Shadow of the Dragon), Świat Ogromnych (World of the Giants), Inwazja (Invasion), Berło (The Scepter) and, currently last, Czas Robotów (Time of the Robots). A spin-off series has been made (Bohaterowie Magicznego Drzewa (The Heroes of the Magic Tree)), currently containing one book: Porwanie (The Abduction).

Awards
 2007 International Emmy Awards
 Won: Children and Young People Award

For the first episode Drewniany pies ("The Wooden Dog"):
 2004 Chicago International Children's Film Festival
Won: Children's Jury Award - Certificate of Merit: Live-Action Television Production
2nd place: "Adult's Jury Award": Live-Action Television Production

Plot overview
The series follows the story of a magical oak tree whose special properties are unknown to the world until it is cut down and turned into a variety of items.

Episodes

References

External links
Series information from FilmPolski database 
 

Polish children's television series
Polish fantasy television series